The Nyssonini are a group of cleptoparasitic bembicine wasps generally distinguished by the petiolate second submarginal cell of the forewing and rather strongly sculptured head and mesosoma (a common trait in cleptoparasitic wasps). Most species also bear sharp propodeal projections and spiny hind tibiae. There are  ~230 spp. in 17 genera worldwide.

References

External links 
 

Crabronidae
Hymenoptera tribes
Biological pest control wasps